Indrek Tustit (born 25 January 1978 in Kuressaare) is an Estonian track and field athlete, coach and physiotherapist.

In 2001 he graduated from the University of Tartu in physical therapy speciality.

1995-2007 he become 8-times Estonian champion in different running disciplines (individual).

2013-2018 he was one of the coaches of Gerd Kanter. Since 2018 he is a coach of Magnus Kirt.

Awards:
 2019: Estonian Coach of the Year (with Marek Vister)

See also
Sport in Estonia

References

Living people
1978 births
Estonian male hurdlers
Estonian sports coaches
University of Tartu alumni
Sportspeople from Kuressaare